Michael Ray McGee (born July 29, 1959) is an American professional basketball coach and former player in the National Basketball Association (NBA). He won two NBA championships as a player with the Los Angeles Lakers.

Early years 
McGee was born in Tyler, Texas. He then moved to Omaha, Nebraska, where he played high school basketball at Omaha North High School. He averaged 38 points per game and scored 916 total points as a senior in the 1976-77 season.

He earned 10 Metro Conference scoring records and had an average of 38.1 points per game. He was named to the  Nebraska All-Star State Team at least twice in the 1970s and was also The World-Herald athlete of the year in 1977.

College career 
McGee accepted a basketball scholarship from the University of Michigan. He became the first player in Michigan Wolverines men's basketball history to lead the team in scoring four consecutive years. He did so with 531 points (19.7 points per game) in the 1977–78 season, 511 points (18.9 points per game) in the 1978–79 season, 665 points (22.2 points per game) in the 1979–80 season, and 732 points (24.4 points per game) in the 1980–81 season. 

He was a four-year starter, graduated as the school's all-time leading scorer and had a career average of 21.4 points per game, while ranking among Michigan's career leaders in several statistical categories.

Awards and accomplishments
 1st in career field goals made (1,010)
 1st in career field goal attempts (2,078)
 2nd in career points (2,439)
 2nd in single season field goals made (309 in 1980–81 season)
 3rd in single season points (732 in 1980–81 season)
 3rd in single season field goal attempts (600 in 1980–81 season)
 5th in career points per game (21.4 points per game)
 5th in free throws made (406)

Professional career 
McGee was selected by the Los Angeles Lakers, in the first round (18th overall) of the 1981 NBA draft. He won two NBA championships  with the Lakers in 1982 and 1985.

On June 16, 1986, he was traded along with the rights to power forward Ken Barlow to the Atlanta Hawks, in exchange for the rights to small forward Billy Thompson and shooting guard Ron Kellogg. He was a reserve player with the Hawks.

On December 14, 1987, he was traded to the Sacramento Kings, in exchange for a 1991 second round draft choice (#30-Rodney Monroe) and a 1995 second round pick (#42-Donnie Boyce). 

On October 31, 1988, he was traded to the New York Nets, in exchange for a 1991 second round draft choice (#31-Randy Brown) and a 1996 second round pick (#37-Jeff McInnis).

On March 25, 1990, he signed as an unrestricted free agent with the Phoenix Suns. He wasn't re-signed after the season.

He played basketball for the Limoges CSP in France, Desio in Italy and Beijing Lions in China. He coached basketball for the Beijing Aoshen and the Shanxi Zhongyu Brave Dragons in the Chinese Basketball Association. He also coached professional basketball teams in Korea.

References

External links 
 

1959 births
Living people
American expatriate basketball people in Italy
American expatriate basketball people in the Philippines
American expatriate basketball people in Venezuela
American men's basketball players
Atlanta Hawks players
Basketball players from Texas
Gaiteros del Zulia players
Los Angeles Lakers draft picks
Los Angeles Lakers players
Michigan Wolverines men's basketball players
New Jersey Nets players
Omaha North High School alumni
Philippine Basketball Association imports
Rapid City Thrillers players
Sacramento Kings players
Shooting guards
Small forwards
Sportspeople from Tyler, Texas
Sta. Lucia Realtors players